Uzbekistan is a doubly landlocked country in Central Asia. Uzbekistan's economy relies mainly on commodity production, including cotton, gold, uranium, and natural gas. Despite the declared objective of transition to a market economy, its government continues to maintain economic controls which imports in favour of domestic "import substitution".

For further information on the types of business entities in this country and their abbreviations, see "Business entities in Uzbekistan".

Notable firms 
This list includes notable companies with primary headquarters located in the country. The industry and sector follow the Industry Classification Benchmark taxonomy. Organizations which have ceased operations are included and noted as defunct.

See also 
 Economy of Uzbekistan

References 

Uzbekistan